Rey Francisco Quiñones (born November 11, 1963) is a Puerto Rican baseball infielder who had a short career in Major League Baseball, primarily as a shortstop.

He played for the Boston Red Sox, the Seattle Mariners, and the Pittsburgh Pirates from 1986 to 1989.

Boston traded him (along with Mike Brown and Mike Trujillo) to the Mariners for Spike Owen and Dave Henderson.

The Mariners traded him to the Pirates (along with Bill Wilkinson) in exchange for Mike Dunne, Mike Walker, and Mark Merchant.  The Pirates released him after a few months.

Quiñones also once missed a game because he was busy playing Nintendo in the clubhouse.

Quinones received a World Series ring from the 1996 New York Yankees, after holding an administrative position with the team. The ring was later sold at auction.

He played 451 games and hit for a .243 average, with 29 home runs and 159 RBIs.

References

External links

1963 births
Living people
Major League Baseball shortstops
Major League Baseball players from Puerto Rico
Boston Red Sox players
Seattle Mariners players
People from Río Piedras, Puerto Rico
Pittsburgh Pirates players
Pawtucket Red Sox players
Atlantic City Surf players
Winston-Salem Spirits players
New Britain Red Sox players
Elmira Pioneers players